In Touch or InTouch may refer to:
Intouch Holdings, a Thai holding company
In Touch (radio series), a programme on BBC Radio 4
In Touch Ministries, a Christian Evangelical organization
In Touch Weekly, a celebrity and lifestyle magazine
InTouch, a quality control firm based in Shenzhen, China
Intouch triangle, interior triangle defined by the 3 points on a circle
In Touch (album), a 1988 album by Phalanx
In Touch, album by Tommy James